Events from the year 1986 in Sweden

Incumbents
 Monarch – Carl XVI Gustaf
 Prime Minister – Olof Palme, Ingvar Carlsson

Events

 28 February – Assassination of Olof Palme.
October - Covered bridge restaurant Nyköpingsbro, southwest of Nyköping, is inaugurated.

Births
23 February - Ola Svensson, singer.
8 April - Carl Klingborg, bandy player.
9 June - Kevin Borg, Maltese-born singer.
13 June - Måns Zelmerlöw, singer.
10 August – Tibor Joza, footballer.
1 October – Filip Björk, professional ice hockey player

Deaths
 28 February – Olof Palme, Prime Minister (born 1927)

References

 
Sweden
Years of the 20th century in Sweden